Euparius pictus is a species of fungus weevil in the beetle family Anthribidae. It is found in Central America and North America.

References

Further reading

 
 

Anthribidae
Articles created by Qbugbot
Beetles described in 1972